My Dad the Rock Star is a traditionally-animated television series created by KISS bassist Gene Simmons, co-produced by Nelvana and Carrere Group for France's M6 and Canada's Teletoon. The series aired on Nickelodeon and Kids WB! in the U.S., from September 1, 2003, until July 5, 2004. Twenty-six episodes were produced.

Plot
The show focuses on Willy Zilla, an ordinary timid teenage boy just trying to be a normal person, despite being the son of a flamboyant, rich, lively celebrity rock star named Rock Zilla.

Production
Gene Simmons wanted to create a cartoon series with a loud rock star for his children. The idea of the cartoon started when Gene's son, Nick, in his kindergarten days, brought in a picture of Gene drooling blood and spitting fire for a project of what his parents do, which may have influenced the character of Willy Zilla.

Before becoming a series, it became a book called "My Dad the Rock Star: Rebel without a Nose Ring" in 2001. Because Gene loved Nelvana shows, he called them for a cartoon idea. It was originally supposed to be about the band KISS itself, but it was later changed to a family of rock-star parents, which were based on Gene's family. Rock Zilla is actually a fictionalized version of Gene Simmons himself, counting his signature "long-tongue". Gene himself chose Lawrence Bayne as the voice for the character. Willy is based on Gene's son, Nick, and Serenity was based on Gene's daughter, Sophie. Crystal was also based on Gene's wife, Shannon Tweed, who, being Canadian, helped Gene to get Nelvana to make the show. Gene served as the executive producer and creator, while the rest of the production was done in Canada.

The series went on hiatus after the episode "Blind Date", until it was announced that the show ended, despite popular ratings, possibly for Gene to continue his music career. Also, there was an unaired episode that showcases Alyssa's true rapping skills, named "Silent Springs' Most Wanted" (which is a reference to the 2003 film Malibu's Most Wanted), but it never got the chance to air. It was never returned in time to air the third season.

Cast

Main

 Joanne Vannicola – William "Willy" Zilla – The show's main protagonist – Rock and Crystal's son and Serenity's younger brother. Willy never had a normal life when he was on tour with his family until he came to Silent Springs. Throughout the series, Willy gradually becomes more comfortable in who he is and accepts his new, more normal lifestyle. Willy aspires to be a musician like his father and grandfather (see below) and has inherited their musical talent. Willy's music of choice is jazz, and plays the trumpet in the school band. He realizes that he was living a normal life the whole time with his family and he doesn't have to be literally normal.
 Lawrence Bayne – Rockford Amadeus "Rock" Zilla – The title character. Rock has loved rock-'n-roll since birth. Even though Rock is the father of the family, he is very immature and behaves like a teenager. His own father is a well-known classical cellist who still does not quite understand him. Despite this, Rock cares for his family very much and goes out of his way to be a decent father.
 Kathy Laskey – Crystal Zilla – Serenity and Willy's mother. Crystal is a pink-haired spiritualist.
 Stephanie Anne Mills – Serenity Zilla – Willy's older sister and Rock and Crystal's daughter. Serenity is the stereotypical teenage girl: spoiled, boy-crazy, egotistical, and ditzy. She picks on Willy and easily gets lost in the mansion. Despite this, she does have a kind side, one of those examples can be shown when she grew attached to the elderly residents in the senior's home in the episode "Rock Bottom". She can also be supportive of her brother at times.
 Don Francks – Nigel "Skunk" Fanshawe – Ex-driver of the Zilla tour bus, friend/manager of the family. Skunk is from England and has a long two-toned ponytail, hence his name. Skunk is often the voice of reason for the Zillas. He uses the tour bus, permanently parked on the mansion's grounds, as his apartment.
 Sarah Gadon – Alyssa – Willy's sarcastic best friend, and eventually girlfriend. She is an environmental activist.
 Martin Villafana – Quincy – Willy's other best friend, who is African-Canadian. Prefers to be called "Q". His father is an accountant and is often known to be narrow-minded.
 Rob Stefaniuk – Robert "Buzz" Sawchuck – Lloyd's son and Willy's school bully. Although brutal and violent, Buzz often speaks in the manner of a Shakespearian actor, making long-winded speeches and monologues. Buzz has a crush on Alyssa, which is not reciprocated.
 Jim Millington – Principal Malfactor – A strict disciplinarian, with a particular dislike for Willy and his father. He once tried to have music class removed from school, and to have Willy expelled. Both times, he was foiled by Rock's intervention. Bears an uncanny resemblance to Ed Sullivan.
 Mr. Kant – The Zillas' next-door neighbour. He utterly despises Rock for all the chaos he causes but has a soft spot for Willy. He has two pets (a cat and a dog), Helga and Henderson, who are friends with Mosh.

Supporting

 Mosh – The Zillas' lovable purple-and-green pet Komodo dragon. Meant only to be a stage gimmick for Rock's performances, the family could not bear to send him away when it didn't work out, and so adopted him as the family pet.
 Ms. Zachwiss – A strict teacher at Willy's school. 
 Scoop – A reporter who harasses Rock Zilla, it's revealed that years ago, Rock was about to be interviewed by Scoop until he accidentally ate a mint from his table. This upset Rock so much that he refused to go onstage causing an uproar. Scoop was fired for this, destroying his career because no one would hire him, and now harasses and stalks Rock and the Zilla family to get back at him.
 Lloyd Sawchuck – Buzz's father and the head of the school board. Also a loyal fan of Rock's music, and has all his albums.
 Angela D'Angelo - The first girl Willy ever fell in love with. Her parents are extremely over-protective and disapprove of Rock Zilla so much that when they learned that Willy was Rock's son, they moved to Alaska to get away from him.

Episodes
Canadian network Teletoon air dates in parentheses:

Season 1
1. Welcome to Silent Springs (09/01/2003)
 Rock and his family move to Silent Springs. Willy disguises himself as "Willy Zillowsky", but he is forced by Buzz to steal Rock's gold record.
2. Zilla House of Horrors (09/08/2003)
 Willy hears Buzz claim that the house is haunted due to being built on a graveyard. 
3. Mr. Zilla's Opus (09/15/2003)
 Rock reveals to everyone in school that Willy is his son when he becomes the school's new band teacher. Even though the teachers find out about Willy lied about his last name, Willy doesn't get in trouble for it. *Note*: "Mr. Zilla's Opus" is a parody of Mr. Holland's Opus.
4. High Infidelity (09/22/2003)
 Crystal opens a Psychic Wellness Centre next to Willy's school, earning Willy some ribbing over his flakey Mom. Buzz tries to become Willy's friend, only for Willy to discover Buzz is now working for two music piracy con men. 
5. Angela D'Angelo (09/29/2003)
 When Willy meets a new student named Angela, she invites him to a pre-date with her parents who dislike Rock Zilla.
6. The Candidate (10/06/2003)
 Willy plans to be the candidate for class representative, but Buzz keeps stealing all of his plans and bullies everyone into voting for him. Willy eventually wins even with the chaos caused by asking his parents to act normal.
7. Willy Unplugged (10/13/2003)
 Willy is going to play his trumpet at the school talent night, but when Rock finds out, he tries to "help" by adding over-the-top theatrics to Willy's show. Alyssa and Q try to get in on Willy's act with less-than-musical results. 
8. Dance Party (10/20/2003)
 Willy joins the dance committee, but the teacher, Ms. Zachwiss, doesn't want the dance to change from the boring theme it had for the past 15 years.
9. Psychic Convention (10/27/2003)
 Crystal asks Willy to come with her to the Psychic Convention to meet Madame Persenchia, but he has to study for a math test and Mosh goes missing.
10. Call of the Wild (11/03/2003)
 The Zillas go on a camping trip with Willy's friends but something goes horribly wrong.
11. Mr. Big (11/10/2003)
 When Sally Raptor, the most popular girl in school, offers Willy a coveted spot in the "in crowd", Willy gets a taste of what it's like to be extremely popular and it rocks! But complications arise when Sally tries to get Willy to abandon Alyssa and Q. Meanwhile, Serenity is terrorizing the neighborhood by practicing to get her driver's license. 
12. Rebel Without A Nose Ring (11/17/2003)
 Buzz sets Willy up to experience a series of unfortunate encounters with Mr. Malfactor after which he labels Willy a Rebel and seizes the opportunity to restore order upon the student body by implementing a dress code. 
13. Meet the Zillas (02/02/2004)
 Rock decides that TV is boring so he starts his own reality show. But later as they prank on Willy, they change the show to "Meet Willy Zilla."

Season 2
14. Going for Broke
 When the Zilla's go broke, Q's father invites them to stay at their house.
15. Rock Is From Mars, Willy Is From Venus
 Willy and Rock try to spend some quality time together, but things don't go as Willy intended. 
16. The Sound of Zilla
 Willy's school is celebrating International Students Week.
17. Home for the Holly Daze
 It's the Zilla's first Christmas in Silent Springs, and when they inadvertently cause a famous Broadway director to lose his job, misery befalls them when he tries to get even. 
18. What's the Scoop?
 Scoop keeps on sneaking out on Rock; Buzz puts Willy in detention after he arrives late. So Scoop and Willy concoct a plan to prove his innocence.
19. Rock Bottom
 It's Rock's birthday, but things get chaotic when Rock gets depressed, Serenity lands herself in the slammer for having large amounts of unpaid parking tickets, and she ends up serving community service at a senior's home, with Rock as her newest patient.
20. Saving Sawchuck
 After Willy saves Buzz from drowning, he has to let Buzz save him from harm; Serenity falls in love with the Lifeguard, so she has lifeguard lessons.
21. King of the Desert
 Willy, Q, and Alyssa take on a band trip but end up in the middle of the desert: Serenity and Crystal have to hide Rock's concert t-shirt (which he refuses to wash) before he comes back. 
22. Big Willy on Campus
 Rock is given an honorary doctorate by his old college, Cere Bellum University, but someone has it in for Rock.
23. Metamorphic Rock
 Willy, Q, and Alyssa are assigned a group project in Science class but with his mother is missing in action, the house gets chaotic.
24. Kant Buy Me Love
 Willy and his friends help their neighbour Mr. Kant throw a silent party.
25. Chip Off the Old Rock
 Rock's parents come to visit him, but they became mortal enemies; Serenity and her grandmother have a day off.
26. Blind Date
 Willy and Alyssa become attracted to each other after a night at the movies. When Willy realizes that he is now dating her, he becomes a wreck, as he is afraid of how Q will react, and what this will mean for the trio's friendship. Meanwhile, Rock is trying to celebrate his 20th anniversary with Crystal, but each of his plans only seems to upset her.

Telecast and home media
The show aired on Teletoon in Canada, M6, Télétoon and Gong in France, and Nickelodeon Kids WB! and Nicktoons Network in the U.S.
Internationally, the show aired on Nicktoons TV and Kix ! in the United Kingdom, RTE Two in Ireland, Cartoon Network and Boomerang in Latin America, Disney Channel and Toon Disney in Germany, and on Nickelodeon in the United Kingdom, Australia and the Netherlands.

On September 20, 2006, the show's DVD was released in the United States by Funimation Entertainment, "Dad's Debut", which contained the first six episodes of the first season: "Welcome to Silent Springs", "Zilla House of Horrors", "Mr. Zilla's Opus", "High Infidelity", "Angela D'Angelo", and "The Candidate".

On April 7, 2009, a second volume of the show was released, "Off The Hook", which contained the next five episodes of the first season: "Willy Unplugged", "Dance Party", "Psychic Convention", "Call of the Wild", and "Mr. Big".

In Canada, three DVDs of the show were released by KaBoom Entertainment : My Dad the Rock Star, Willy Unplugged, and Call of the Wild.

As of 2022, the show is now streaming on Tubi as well as on Pluto TV.

Reception
Common Sense Media rated the show 4 out of 5 stars, stating, "My Dad the Rock Star actually offers positive social messages, although they're subtle and blended in with wit and irony. Willy is perfectly happy with his slightly goofy, non-rock star self, and so are his friends, a pair of cool kids who aren't bowled over by either the Zillas' fame or fortune. These friends are loyal, and so is Willy, who may not always approve of his family but never fails to back them up. At its core, My Dad the Rock Star is a simple cartoon about the difficulties of staying yourself and still fitting in. It's fun to indulge the fantasy of the childlike parent and mature child – and the lifestyle that goes with crazy money – but the series' point is always that even though Willy could have anything in the world, what he wants most is to stay put and lead a normal life with his friends."

References

External links
 

2000s Canadian animated television series
2000s French animated television series
2003 Canadian television series debuts
2003 French television series debuts
2004 Canadian television series endings
2004 French television series endings
Animated television series about families
Canadian children's animated comedy television series
English-language television shows
French children's animated comedy television series
Nickelodeon original programming
Nicktoons (TV network) original programming
Teen animated television series
Teletoon original programming
Television series by Nelvana